The Ykkönen 2012 season began on 27 April 2012 and ended on 6 October 2012.

The champions will be directly promoted to the 2013 Veikkausliiga. The two teams finishing at the bottom of the table will be directly relegated to Kakkonen.

Overview

A total of ten teams will contest in the league, including eight sides from the 2011 season, RoPS who was relegated from Veikkausliiga  and SJK who promoted from Kakkonen after winning the promotion play-offs.

Managerial changes

League table

Results

Matches 1–18

Matches 19–27

Statistics
Updated to games played on 6 October 2012.

Top scorers
Source: palloverkko.palloliitto.fi

See also
2012 Veikkausliiga
2012 Finnish League Cup
2012 Suomen Cup
2012 Kakkonen

References

External links
 Official site 

Ykkönen seasons
2012 in Finnish football leagues
Fin
Fin